A number of Christian militias in Iraq and Syria have been formed since the start of the Syrian Civil War and in the 2013-2017 War. The militias are composed of fighters mainly from the Assyrian but also include Arab and Armenian Christian communities in Syria, and Assyrians in Iraq have formed militias in the north to protect Assyrian communities, towns and villages in the Assyrian homeland and Nineveh Plains. Some foreign Christian fighters from the Western world have also joined these militias.

After the spread of the conflicts, and the rise of the Islamist factions, many Christian civilians fled, in particular in fear of Islamic State of Iraq and the Levant (ISIL), who have violently persecuted Christians in the areas that have come under their control. Some of those that have stayed formed militias, largely to protect their own populations from ISIL and other hardline Sunni Islamist factions such as al-Qaeda's Nusra Front, Ahrar al-Sham, and Jund al-Aqsa. While initially forming to protect their own territory, some of the larger militias have gone on the offensive.

Before the war, as much as 10% of the population in Syria was Assyrian, Armenian, or Arab Christian, who made up one of the largest Christian minorities in the Middle East. In the early days of the civil war, some Christian communities were given arms by both the Syrian government and Kurdish groups, to defend themselves against sectarian Sunni Islamist Syrian rebels. The Syriac Military Council, a Syriac-Assyrian Christian militia allied with the Kurdish-majority People's Protection Units (YPG), is the largest Christian militia in the Syrian civil war. By comparison with some of the other armed groups in Syria, Christian militias are small, and dependent on the Syrian government or the Autonomous Administration of North and East Syria. Defence units set up under the auspices of the Syrian government are called Popular Committees, which have since been integrated into the National Defence Forces. 

Maronite Christians in Lebanon have also formed militias to fight against Islamic State incursions from Syria.

Syria

Syrian Democratic Forces

The following militias are part of the Syrian Democratic Forces of the Autonomous Administration of North and East Syria.

Syriac Military Council

The Syriac Military Council (Syriac abbreviation: MFS) is largely composed of Assyrian and some Armenian Christians, with its headquarters in al-Malikiyah. Based in the Jazira Region, it is the main armed Christian militia in the Autonomous Administration of North and East Syria. The group is allied with the mainly-Kurdish People's Protection Units (YPG) and has more than 2,000 members. In 2013, the militia confronted, with its allies, the al-Nusra Front in Tell Hamis, during the Al-Hasakah Governorate campaign (2012–2013), and finally regained the town during the Eastern al-Hasakah offensive in late February 2015. Later that year, the MSF defended the Christian villages of the Khabur valley from Islamic State of Iraq and the Levant attacks. They were also involved in the 2015 Al-Hasakah city offensive, successfully capturing the town from the Islamic State, in conjunction with the YPG.
The group is armed mainly with light and some medium weapons, and some armoured vehicles, and has appealed to the West for heavier weapons. The West presently only sends weapons to other rebel groups, but has so far not offered any aid, with the militia sourcing most of its low-level weapons locally. In October 2015, the Syriac Military Council was one of the founding components of the Syrian Democratic Forces.

Bethnahrain Women's Protection Forces

The Bethnahrain Women's Protection Forces is a small female-only subunit of the MFS, the formation of which was influenced by the Women's Protection Units.

Martyr Nubar Ozanyan Brigade

On April 24, 2019 the "Martyr Nubar Ozanyan Brigade" was formed as an Armenian brigade of the Syrian Democratic Forces on the anniversary of the Armenian genocide in the Marziya Church in Tell Goran.

Khabour Guards

The Khabour Guards is an Assyrian Syrian militia created after the collapse of Syrian government control in the Assyrian-majority Khabur valley northwest of al-Hasakah Governorate. The militia is composed of locals and maintains checkpoints in several Assyrian villages, most notably Tel Tamer. Though officially neutral and nonpartisan, the Khabour Guards are de facto affiliated with the Assyrian Democratic Party along with Nattoreh.

Nattoreh

The Assyrian People's Guard – Nattoreh is an Assyrian Syrian militia based in the Khabur valley town of Tell Tamer northwest of Al-Hasakah, an area with a large Assyrian population. The militia is composed of local Assyrians and is along with the Khabour Guards affiliated with the Assyrian Democratic Party.

Sutoro

Sutoro which is also known as the Syriac Security Office or the Sutoro Police, is an ethnic Assyrian, Syriac-Christian police force in Jazira Canton of the Federation of Northern Syria – Rojava in Syria, where it works in concert with the general Kurdish Asayish police force of the canton with the mission to police ethnic Assyrian areas and neighbourhoods. It is based around the city of Qamishli and has around 1,200 fighters, and arms checkpoints in Assyrian populated parts of cities, together with Assyrian towns and villages such as Tell Tamer.

Regime

The following militias are part of the military of Syria, under the government of Syria.

Gozarto Protection Force

This is a largely Syriac-Assyrian militia based in Qamishli, in Syria's north-east. It is allied with the Syrian government, and fights in conjunction with the Syrian Army. It has been active in the defense of the majority Christian town of Sadad from Islamic State of Iraq and the Levant. The militia has 500 fighters.

Guardians of the Dawn

The Guardians of the Dawn are a coalition of Syrian Christian pro-government militias from southern Syria.

Sootoro

The Sootoro is another Assyrian militia based only in the city of Qamishli, in North Eastern Syria. It is aligned with the Syrian regime, and has clashed not only with ISIL, but with the YPG and Sutoro, which it accuses of trying to appropriate Assyrian lands.

Iraq

Nineveh Plain Protection Units

 
The Nineveh Plain Protection Units or NPU is an Assyrian military organization that was formed late in 2014, largely but not exclusively by Assyrians in Iraq to defend themselves against Islamic State. The Nineveh Plains is a region where Assyrians in Iraq have traditionally been concentrated. The Assyrian Security force Nineveh Plain Protection Units currently run the security in many Towns and Villages in the Nineveh Plains

The Assyrian Policy Institute reports that the NPU has 2,000 men registered to be trained awaiting approval and funding from the Federal government of Iraq and that they currently have 600 active soldiers deployed and running the security in towns such as Bakhdida, Karamlesh and partly in Bartella where the security is contested by PMF Brigade 30 or known as the Shabak Militia with the support of the Badr Organization leaving the NPU outnumbered

The Nineveh Plain Guard Forces (NPGF)

The Nineveh Plain Guard Forces also known as Christian Peshmerga is composed of former members of the Church Guards that were forced to disband and disarm in 2014 as Kurdish officials began confiscating weapons that belonged to local Assyrians prior to the ISIS invasion that left the Assyrians defenceless. 

It's estimated that they currently have 1,500 Assyrian soldiers under Peshmerga command

Dwekh Nawsha 

Dwekh Nawsha is an Assyrian Christian militia defending the Christian cities in the Nineveh province of Iraq. A number of foreign Western Christian fighters have joined the militia in order aid in the effort.

A report by the Assyrian Policy Institute released in June 2020 claimed that Dwekh Nawsha was eventually disbanded and that all of its social media accounts have been deleted.

Nineveh Plain Forces

The Nineveh Plain Forces or NPF is a military organization that was formed on 6 January 2015 by indigenous Assyrian Christians in Iraq, in cooperation with Peshmerga, to defend against Islamic State of Iraq and the Levant.

A 2020 Report by the Assyrian Policy Institute claimed that the NPF was disbanded in 2017 following the unsuccessful Kurdistan Region independence referendum.

Babylon Brigade

The Babylon Brigade nominally Christian militia that was formed as part of Iraq's Popular Mobilization Forces by Rayan al-Kildani, a Chaldean Catholic Assyrian with close ties to the Badr Organization,

Kataib Rouh Allah Issa Ibn Miriam

Kataib Rouh Allah Issa Ibn Miriam (lit. The Brigade of the Spirit of God Jesus Son of Mary) is a militia composed of Assyrian Christians trained and supplied by an Iraqi Shi'ite militia as a subgroup of the Kata'ib al-Imam Ali in the fight against ISIL.

See also

Christianity in Iraq
Christianity in Syria
Christian state
History of Christian flags
Military order (religious society)

References

Works cited
 

History of Christianity in Syria